René Varas (born 19 May 1936) is a Chilean equestrian. He competed in two events at the 1972 Summer Olympics.

References

1936 births
Living people
Chilean male equestrians
Olympic equestrians of Chile
Equestrians at the 1972 Summer Olympics
Pan American Games medalists in equestrian
Pan American Games bronze medalists for Chile
Equestrians at the 1971 Pan American Games
Place of birth missing (living people)
Medalists at the 1971 Pan American Games
20th-century Chilean people